Donald Beezley was a state legislator in Colorado from 2010 to 2012.  He represented the 33rd district, centered on Broomfield, Colorado.

Biography

Early life and education
Beezley earned his B.S. in finance from the University of Colorado.  He went on to receive an M.A. in liberal studies from Regis University in 2006.  Since 2002, Beezley has been the vice president of M&A ProForma West Limited, a mergers and acquisition firm.  He has also worked as president of Tager Enterprises since 2005.  He is the managing member of Health Source Regional Development LLC, a position he has held since 2007.

Legislative career

2010 election
Beezley ran against Democratic incumbent Dianne Primavera for the 33rd State House District seat, a legislative district which contained more registered Republicans than Democrats though was still considered a swing district.  This race was among those targeted by Colorado Republicans hoping to make gains during the midterm 2010 legislative elections.   Beezley narrowly unseated Primavera with 50.4% of the vote after receiving 314 more votes, one of the closest legislative races in the state.  Beezley was sworn into office in January 2011.

2011 legislative session

In the 2011 - 2012 legislative session, Beezley was appointed to the committees on Education and Finance.

2012 legislative session

2012 election
In the 2012 general election, Representative Beezley announced he would not seek re-election.  Beezley's campaign was taken over by David Pigott who faced Democratic challenger Dianne Primavera.  Primavera was elected by a margin of 50% to 44%.

References

External links
Colorado General Assembly profile

Living people
People from Broomfield, Colorado
University of Colorado alumni
Regis University alumni
Republican Party members of the Colorado House of Representatives
21st-century American politicians
Year of birth missing (living people)